Nassarius deshayesianus is a species of sea snail, a marine gastropod mollusc in the family Nassariidae, the nassa mud snails (USA) or dog whelks (UK).

Description
The shell grows to a length of 15 mm

Distribution
This species occurs in the Red Sea and the Strait of Hormuz.

References

 Sowerby, G.B., III. (1894). Descriptions of four new shells from the Persian Gulf and Bay of Zaila. Proceedings of the Malacological Society of London. 1(4): 160–161, pl. 12.
 Melvill, J.C. & Sykes, E.R. (1899). Notes on a third collection of marine shells from the Andaman Islands, with descriptions of three new species of Mitra. Proceedings of the Malacological Society of London. 3: 220–229.
 Vine, P. (1986). Red Sea Invertebrates. Immel Publishing, London. 224 pp
 Petit R.E. (2009) George Brettingham Sowerby, I, II & III: their conchological publications and molluscan taxa. Zootaxa 2189: 1–218.

External links
 Issel, A. (1865). Catalogo dei molluschi raccolti dalla missione italiana in Persia aggiuntavi la descrizione delle specie nuove o poco note. Stamperia Reale, Torino, 55 pp
 Jousseaume, F. (1888). Description des mollusques recueillis par M. le Dr. Faurot dans la Mer Rouge et le Golfe d'Aden. Mémoires de la Société Zoologique de France. 1: 165-223
 Cernohorsky W. O. (1984). Systematics of the family Nassariidae (Mollusca: Gastropoda). Bulletin of the Auckland Institute and Museum 14: 1–356
 

Nassariidae
Gastropods described in 1866